Streptomyces recifensis is a bacterium species from the genus of Streptomyces which has been isolated from soil from Recife in Brazil.

See also 
 List of Streptomyces species

References

Further reading

External links
Type strain of Streptomyces recifensis at BacDive -  the Bacterial Diversity Metadatabase

recifensis
Bacteria described in 1957